Belleview Heights, also known as the Rigas House, is located at 61500 Candlewick Lane in Bellaire, Ohio. The house and gardens were placed on the National Register on 1994-04-08.

The mansion once housed Bob Hope during 1951, and was also the site of the premiere of My Favorite Spy.

References 

National Register of Historic Places in Belmont County, Ohio
Houses on the National Register of Historic Places in Ohio
Houses completed in 1928
Houses in Belmont County, Ohio